Jens is a male given name and a Danish, German, Norwegian, Swedish, Icelandic, Faroese and Frisian derivative of Johannes. It was the top given name for boys in Denmark in 2008. 

People with the name include:
Jens Arnsted, musician
Jens Bergensten, Swedish video game developer.
Jens Blauenfeldt, television actor, screenwriter, and director for Danmarks Radio
Jens Eriksen, Danish Olympic badminton player
Jens Fink-Jensen, Danish author, composer and photographer
Jens Gad, musician and composer
Jens Geier, German politician
Jens Peter Hansen, Danish Olympic footballer
Jens Jensen (landscape architect), Danish-American landscape architect
Jens Jensen (politician), Australian politician and Minister for the Navy
Jens Jensen (trade unionist), Danish trade unionist and politician
Jens Kristian Jensen, Danish gymnast
Jens Jeremies, German footballer
Jens Johansson, keyboardist and pianist
Jens Kidman, Swedish vocalist of the band Meshuggah
Jens Lapidus, Swedish author
Jens Larsen, Danish volleyball player and coach
Jens Peter Larsen, Danish musicologist and conductor
Jens Lehmann, German footballer
Jens Lekman, Swedish pop musician
Jens Lieblein, Norwegian egyptologist
Jens Lindhard, Danish physicist
Jens Lindhardt, Danish rower
Jens Otto Krag, former Prime Minister of Denmark
Jens Johnnie "Little Evil" Pulver, first Ultimate Fighting Championship (UFC) lightweight champion
Jens Salumäe, Estonian Olympic ski jumper
Jens Christian Skou, Danish Nobel Prize winner (Chemistry 1997)
Jens Spahn, German politician
Jens Stoltenberg, Secretary General of NATO and former Prime Minister of Norway
Jens Stryger Larsen, Danish footballer
Jens Toornstra, Dutch footballer currently playing for Feyenoord
Jens Voigt, German professional road bicycle racer
Jens Weißflog, German ski jumper

See also
 Jens (disambiguation)

References

Faroese masculine given names
Danish masculine given names